Nariman Karbalayi Najaf oghlu Narimanov (– 19 March 1925) was an Azerbaijani Bolshevik revolutionary, writer, publicist, politician and statesman. For just over one year beginning in May 1920, Narimanov headed the government of Soviet Azerbaijan. He was subsequently elected chairman of the Union Council of the Transcaucasian SFSR. He was also Party Chairman of the Central Executive Committee of the Soviet Union from 30 December 1922 until the day of his death.

In the realm of literature, Narimanov translated into Turkic Nikolai Gogol's The Government Inspector and wrote many plays, stories and novels, such as Bahadur and Sona (1896). He was also the author of the historical trilogy, Nadir-Shah (1899).

One of the central districts and  one of the busiest metro stations in Baku, together with a number of streets, parks and halls all over Azerbaijan, as well as Azerbaijan Medical University, are named after him. In the Lankaran region, there is a town named Narimanabad in his honor. There are also towns named after him in other post-Soviet states, mainly in Russia.

Biography

Early years

Nariman Narimanov was born on 14 April (2 April O.S.) 1870 in Tiflis, Georgia, then part of the Russian Empire into an ethnic Azerbaijani family. The Narimanov family were middle-class merchants and were able to send their son to the Gori Teachers Seminary, from which he graduated. He went on to attend medical school at "Imperial Novorossiya University" (present-day "Odessa University"), graduating in 1908.

As a young man, Narimanov gained notice as a writer in Azerbaijan even before the revolution of 1905-1907, publishing novels which advocated the abandonment of tired customs and religious superstitions. He simultaneously taught school in the village of Gizel-Adjal, Tiflis Province, where he became closely acquainted with the hard life of the local peasantry. Narimanov was one of the first activists of young Turkic literature. He translated into Turkic Gogol's Inspector and wrote many plays, stories and novels; the most well known among them being the novel, Bahadur and Sona (1896), and a historical trilogy, Nadir-shah (1899).

During the 1905 Revolution, Narimanov joined the Bolshevik party, took an active part and led the student movement in Odessa. He subsequently became one of the organizers of the Social Democratic Party. For these activities, Narimanov was arrested in 1909 and sentenced to five years' internal exile in Astrakhan.

Political career

After the October Revolution of 1917, Nariman Narimanov became the chairman of the Azerbaijani social democratic political party, Hummet (Endeavor), the forerunner of the Communist Party of Azerbaijan. He did not run for election on the Hummet slate, however, and was thus not a member of the Baku Soviet during the brief reign of the Baku Commune of 1918. He was appointed People's Commissar of National Economy by the Baku Soviet, however.

Following the fall of the Baku Soviet, Narimanov managed to escape the city to Astrakhan, thereby avoiding the grim fate of the 26 Baku Commissars. He was there appointed chief of the Near East Division of the People's Commissariat of Foreign Affairs of Soviet Russia, later moving to a position as Deputy People's Commissar in the Commissariat of National Affairs. Narimanov was an advocate of national autonomy within a federated Soviet structure and is widely viewed as being instrumental in the July 1919 decision of the Politburo to recognize Azerbaijan as an independent Soviet Republic.

In 1920, Narimanov was appointed the chairman of the Azerbaijani Revolutionary Committee (Azrevkom) and, shortly thereafter, the Chairman of the Council of People's Commissars' (Sovnarkom) of the Azerbaijani Soviet Republic. In April and May 1922, he took part in the Genoese Conference as a member of the Soviet delegation. In 1922, he was elected the chairman of the Union Council of the Transcaucasian Federation. On 30 December 1922, the first session of the Central Executive Committee of the USSR elected Narimanov as one of the four chairpersons of the Central Executive Committee of the USSR.

In April 1923, Narimanov was elected as a candidate for the Central Committee of the RKP(b) (Russian Communist Party of Bolsheviks). The charismatic moderate nationalist clashed with Joseph Stalin's close associate Sergo Ordzhonikidze, who led the Communist Party in Transcaucasia. As a result of this conflict, Ordzhonikidze had Narimanov transferred to posts in Moscow to remove him from the Caucasus.

Death and legacy

Narimanov died in bed of a heart attack on 19 March 1925. He was 54 years old at the time of his death. He is buried in Mass Grave No. 7 of the Kremlin Wall Necropolis in Red Square, Moscow.

Leon Trotsky called Narimanov's death the second biggest loss for the Eastern world after that of Lenin. Sergo Ordzhonikidze described Narimanov as "the greatest representative of our party in the East".

During the Ezhovshchina of the late 1930s, Narimanov was posthumously denounced along with all other members of Hummet for their alleged nationalism. This action was reversed after the liberalization which followed the death of Joseph Stalin in 1953 and Narimanov was again celebrated as a leading figure in the history of Azerbaijani communism, though in 1959, official CPSU policy was still to downplay Narimanov's role and stress that of Shaumian within the Azerbaijani context. It was only in 1972 that Narimanov was fully rehabilitated within his homeland.

Narimanov was survived by his wife Gulsum and by his son Najaf, who joined the Red Army in 1938 and graduated from the Kiev Higher Military Radio-Technical Engineering School in 1940. He became a member of the Communist Party in 1942. During the Great Patriotic War, he was the commander of a tank division and took part in the Battle of Stalingrad and the Battle of the Dnieper before being killed in action near Volnovakha in Ukraine.

 : Monuments in Baku, Ganja and Sumgayit, cinema, metro station, schools, raion, village streets in Baku also in Imishli (city) and Ganja, Azerbaijan Medical University, central park as well as villages of Narimanly in Shamkir and Geranboy and Narimankend in Bilasuvar, Gobustan, Gədəbəy and Sabirabad regions of Azerbaijan, Nariman Narimanov Stadium.
 : a village in the village hall of Aleksichskom Khoiniki district, Gomel region.
 : a street (changed its name into Kutaisi in 1932), a museum in Tbilisi (not active anymore), culture center, school, monument and street in Marneuli.
 : Kostanay Airport (Narimanovka).
 : Narimanov, Astrakhan Oblast, a khutor in Leninskoye Rural Settlement of Zimovnikovsky District of Rostov Oblast, a settlement in Nurlatsky District of the Republic of Tatarstan, a village in Narimanovsky Rural Okrug of Tyumensky District of Tyumen Oblast, raion in Baskhortostan, avenue and the area in Ulyanovsk, culture center in Shatura, streets in Volgograd, Chernyanka Belgorod regions, Kostroma and Moscow, street near railway of Voronezh. Narimanov's name once given to Moscow Institute of Oriental Studies.
 : a street in Bayramali.
 : an alleyway in Odessa, a street in Kharkiv, village in Kirovagradskiy Oblast.
 : a city Payarik was once called as "Narimanovka". A city in Taskhent oblast. Senatoruim.

Footnotes

Further reading

 Audrey Altstadt, The Azerbaijani Turks: Power and Identity Under Russian Rule. Stanford, CA: Stanford University Press, 1992.
 The Great Soviet Encyclopedia. Third edition. Moscow: 1970-77.

External links
 Nariman Narimanov: Early Years of Bolsheviks - Wrong Direction, Azerbaijan International- AZER.com
 Nariman Narimanov: Son, Let Me Tell You What It Was Really Like - AZER.com
 Nariman Narimanov's museum in Baku

1870 births
1925 deaths
Azerbaijani revolutionaries
Bolsheviks
Burials at the Kremlin Wall Necropolis
Writers from Tbilisi
People from Tiflis Governorate
Georgian Azerbaijanis
Russian Social Democratic Labour Party members
Azerbaijan Communist Party (1920) politicians
Azerbaijani writers
Azerbaijani atheists
Transcaucasian Teachers Seminary alumni
Transcaucasian Socialist Federative Soviet Republic People
National communism in the Soviet Union